The following are Roads in Oxford County, Ontario as maintained by that county:

External links

Oxford